The athletics events at the 2021 Southeast Asian Games took place from 14 to 19 May 2022 in Hanoi, Vietnam. The Games featured a total of 47 events.

Venue

Most track and field events were held at Mỹ Đình National Stadium with the exception of hammer throw and discus throw events being held at nearby fields within the National Sports Complex. The marathon and 20km walk events were contested at the nearby Hanoi Street Circuit.

Hanoi Sports Training and Competition Centre served as the practice venue.

Schedule

Medal table

Medalists

Men's events

Women's events

Mixed

References

Athletics at the 2021 Southeast Asian Games